Joseph Moroni (born 10 January 1938, died 2 July 2020 in Brem-sur-Mer) was French rower. He competed at the 1960 Summer Olympics in Rome with the men's eight where they came fourth.

References

1938 births
2020 deaths
French male rowers
Olympic rowers of France
Rowers at the 1960 Summer Olympics
Sportspeople from Seine-Saint-Denis
World Rowing Championships medalists for France
Rowers at the 1964 Summer Olympics
European Rowing Championships medalists